Edward Stafford, 3rd Duke of Buckingham  (3 February 1478 – 17 May 1521) was an English nobleman. He was the son of Henry Stafford, 2nd Duke of Buckingham, and Katherine Woodville, and nephew of Elizabeth Woodville and King Edward IV. Thus, Edward Stafford was a first cousin once removed of King Henry VIII. He was convicted of treason and executed on 17 May 1521.

Family
Edward Stafford, born 3 February 1478 at Brecon Castle in Wales, was the eldest son of Henry Stafford, 2nd Duke of Buckingham, and Catherine Woodville (the daughter of Richard Woodville, 1st Earl Rivers, by Jacquetta of Luxembourg, daughter of Pierre de Luxembourg, Count of St. Pol) and was thus a nephew of Elizabeth Woodville and King Edward IV.

By his father's marriage to Catherine Woodville, Stafford had a younger brother, Henry Stafford, 1st Earl of Wiltshire, and two sisters: Elizabeth, who married Robert Radcliffe, 1st Earl of Sussex, and Anne, who married firstly Sir Walter Herbert (d. 16 September 1507), an illegitimate son of William Herbert, 1st Earl of Pembroke, and secondly George Hastings, 1st Earl of Huntingdon.

After the execution of the 2nd Duke of Buckingham, his widow, Catherine Woodville, married Jasper Tudor, second son of Owen Tudor and King Henry V's widow, Catherine of Valois. After Jasper Tudor's death on 21 December 1495, Catherine Woodville married Sir Richard Wingfield (d. 22 July 1525). Catherine Woodville died 18 May 1497. After her death, Sir Richard Wingfield married Bridget Wiltshire, daughter and heiress of Sir John Wiltshire of Stone, Kent.

Career
In October 1483 Stafford's father was central in Buckingham's rebellion against King Richard III. He was beheaded without trial on 2 November 1483, whereby all his honours were forfeited. Stafford is said to have been hidden in various houses in Herefordshire at the time of the rebellion, and perhaps for the remainder of Richard III's reign. After Richard III's defeat at Bosworth on 22 August 1485, and King Henry VII's accession to the crown, Stafford was made a Knight of the Order of the Bath on 29 October 1485 as Duke of Buckingham, and attended Henry VII's coronation the following day, although his father's attainder was not formally reversed by Parliament until November. The young Duke's wardship and lands were granted, on 3 August 1486, along with the wardship of his younger brother, Henry Stafford, to the King's mother, Margaret Beaufort, and according to Davies it is likely Buckingham was educated in her various households.

Buckingham was in attendance at court at the elevation of Henry VII's second son, the future King Henry VIII, as Duke of York, on 9 November 1494, and was made a Knight of the Order of the Garter in 1495. In September 1497 he was a captain in the forces sent to quell a rebellion in Cornwall. 

As a young man, Buckingham played a conspicuous part in royal weddings and the reception of ambassadors and foreign princes, "dazzling observers by his sartorial splendour". At the wedding of Henry VII's eldest son and heir Arthur, Prince of Wales, and Catherine of Aragon in 1501, he is said to have worn a gown worth £1500. He was the chief challenger at the jousting tournament held the following day.

At the accession of King Henry VIII, Buckingham was appointed on 23 June 1509, for the day of the coronation only, Lord High Constable, an office which he claimed by hereditary right. He also served as Lord High Steward at the coronation and bearer of the crown. In 1509 he was made a member of the King's Privy Council. On 9 July 1510 he had licence to crenellate his manor of Thornbury, Gloucestershire, and according to Davies rebuilt the manor house as "an impressively towered castle" with "huge oriel windows in the living-quarters in the inner court".

In 1510 Buckingham was involved in a scandal concerning his sister, Anne, who was the wife of George Hastings, 1st Earl of Huntingdon. After hearing rumours concerning her and Sir William Compton, Buckingham found Compton in Anne's room. Compton was forced to take the sacrament to prove that he and Anne had not committed adultery, and Anne's husband sent her away to a convent  from the court. There is no extant evidence establishing that Anne and Sir William Compton were guilty of adultery. In 1523 Compton took the unusual step of bequeathing land to Anne in his will, and directing his executors to include her in the prayers for his kin for which he had made provision in his will. There are some suggestions that the affair continued until 1513.  He returned to the King's graces, being present at the marriage of Henry's sister, served in Parliament and was present at negotiations with Francis I of France and Charles V, Holy Roman Emperor. 

From June to October 1513 Buckingham served as a captain during Henry VIII's invasion of France, commanding 500 men in the "middle ward". About 1517 he was one of 12 challengers chosen to joust against the King and his companions but excused himself on the ground that he feared to run against the King's person. He and his wife, Eleanor, attended the Field of the Cloth of Gold in 1520.

Although Buckingham was appointed to commissions of the peace in 1514 and charged—together with other Marcher lords—with responsibility for keeping order in south Wales, particularly along the borderland Welsh Marches, he was rebuked by the King in 1518 for failing to achieve the desired results. Buckingham exercised little direct political influence and was never a member of the King's inner circle.

Betrayal and execution
Buckingham was one of few peers with substantial Plantagenet blood and maintained numerous connections, often among his extended family, with the rest of the upper aristocracy, activities which attracted Henry's suspicion. During 1520, Buckingham became suspected of potentially treasonous actions and Henry authorised an investigation. The King personally examined witnesses against him, gathering enough evidence for a trial. The Duke was finally summoned to Court in April 1521 and arrested and placed in the Tower. He was tried before a panel of 17 peers, being accused of listening to prophecies of the King's death and intending to kill the King. Buckingham was executed on Tower Hill on 17 May 1521 and posthumously attainted by Act of Parliament on 31 July 1523, disinheriting most of his wealth from his children.

Some conclude this was one of the few executions of high personages under Henry VIII in which the accused was "almost certainly guilty". However, Sir Thomas More complained that the key evidence was hearsay from servants who, as commoners, were threatened and tortured to extract false confessions.

Buckingham's literary patronage included two translations, a printed translation of Helyas, Knyghte of the Swanne (on the Knight of the Swan), which he commissioned in 1512, and A Lytell Cronicle, a translation of an account of the Near East which he may have commissioned in 1520 in connection with his proposed pilgrimage to Jerusalem.

Marriage and issue
In 1488, Henry VII had suggested a marriage between Buckingham and Anne of Brittany, but in December 1489 the executors of Henry Percy, 4th Earl of Northumberland, paid the King £4,000 for Buckingham's marriage to Percy's eldest daughter Eleanor (d. 1530). They had a son and three daughters:

Henry Stafford, 1st Baron Stafford (18 September 1501 – 30 April 1563), who married Ursula Pole, daughter of Sir Richard Pole by his wife, Margaret, Countess of Salisbury, daughter of George, Duke of Clarence.
Lady Elizabeth Stafford (c. 1497 – 30 November 1558), the second wife of Thomas Howard, 3rd Duke of Norfolk.
Lady Katherine Stafford (c. 1499 – 14 May 1555), who married Ralph Neville, 4th Earl of Westmorland.
Lady Mary Stafford, the youngest daughter, who married, about June 1519, as his third wife, George Neville, 5th Baron Bergavenny.

Buckingham is also said to have had three illegitimate children:

George Stafford.
Henry Stafford.
Margaret Stafford (c. 1511 – 25 May 1537), whom Buckingham married to his ward, Thomas Fitzgerald of Leixlip, half-brother to the Earl of Kildare.

In fiction
The accusation and condemnation of Buckingham is depicted in the Shakespeare play Henry VIII.
 In the 2003 two-part drama Henry VIII starring Ray Winstone and Helena Bonham Carter, Buckingham is played by Charles Dance. His character was a minor one, killed off in the first 15 minutes.
Buckingham is a character in the first two episodes of the first season of the drama series The Tudors in 2007. Portrayed by Steven Waddington, Buckingham's intrigues are fictionalised, with several key facts omitted.
Buckingham's (fictional) son is a character in the novel The Blanket of the Dark, by John Buchan (1931). He has grown up as Peter Pentecost in the forests near Oxford and is told of his true heritage in the year 1536. Later he has a fateful encounter with the King and decides that he does not wish to pursue a life of power.
He is portrayed by Olly Rix in the 2019 Starz miniseries The Spanish Princess, where he is depicted early on as seducing one of Catherine of Aragon's ladies in waiting.

Notes

References

Citations

Sources

External links
Thornbury Castle
Stafford family, Tudorplace website

|-

1478 births
1521 deaths
People from Brecon
03
Knights of the Garter
Lord High Constables of England
Lord High Stewards
Executions at the Tower of London
Prisoners in the Tower of London
People executed under Henry VIII
Executed English people
15th-century English people
16th-century English nobility
Edward
People executed by Tudor England by decapitation
Male Shakespearean characters
Executed Welsh people
Welsh politicians convicted of crimes
Burials at Austin Friars, London
People executed under the Tudors for treason against England